Farum Arena is a multi-purpose arena, located in Copenhagen, Denmark. The seating capacity of the arena varies, from 3,000 people. The arena is part of a sport complex located in Copenhagen.

Sports venues in Copenhagen
Farum